Umm Sabuna, was a Palestinian Arab village in the District of Baysan. It was depopulated by the Israel Defense Forces during the 1948 Arab-Israeli War on May 21, 1948, as part of Operation Gideon. It was located 10.5 km northeast of Baysan and the 'Ayn Umm-Sabuna provided the village with water.

Location
Umm Sabuna was located at the foothill south-east of  Kawkab al-Hawa.

History

Ottoman era
In 1882,  the PEF's Survey of Western Palestine found at Kh. Umm Sabôn "Foundations of buildings, apparently modern."

British Mandate  era
In the  1931 census of Palestine,  conducted by the  Mandatory Palestine authorities, it was counted under the Arab Es Saqr, who had a total population of 444; 443 Muslims and 1 Christian, in a total of 85  houses.

The village was classified as a "hamlet" by the Palestine Index Gazetteer.

The population in 1948 was 868.

1948 and aftermath
Khirbat Umm Sabuna presumably became depopulated as part of Operation Gideon, between 16 and 21  May, 1948. Following the war the area was incorporated into the State of Israel. Kibbutz Neve Ur was established in 1949, 1 km east of the village site.

In 1992, the village site was described: "Only stone rubble remains on the village site. An orchard owned by the Neve Ur kibbutz is on village land. The hilly areas around the site are used by Israeli farmers for grazing."

References

Bibliography

External links
Welcome To Umm Sabuna, Khirbat
 Khirbat Umm Sabuna,  Zochrot
Survey of Western Palestine, map 9:   IAA, Wikimedia commons 

Arab villages depopulated during the 1948 Arab–Israeli War